The Democratic Social Party (PDS) was a conservative Brazilian political party.

It was established in 1979 as a continuation of the National Renewal Alliance (ARENA), the political wing of the military during the 1965–79 military dictatorship, at a time in which the country was moving away from authoritarianism. However, the official foundation date is 31 January 1980. In 1985, when Paulo Maluf won the party's nomination for the presidential bid, a huge group, led by José Sarney (former leader of ARENA from 1971 to 1980 and of the PDS from 1980–85), Jorge Bornhausen and Marco Maciel, founded the Liberal Front Party (PFL). Sarney was elected Vice-President in that year's election, but he served from the beginning as President, due to the death of President-elect Tancredo Neves.

The Democratic Social Party suffered bad defeats in both the 1986 (7.9%) and 1990 (8.9%) elections for the Chamber of Deputies, when at the same time PFL took 17.7% and 12.4%. In 1986, in particular, the party was seriously defeated also in state elections, so that all of the 12 governorships won in 1982 were lost.

In 1993 the party merged with the Christian Democratic Party (3.0% in 1990 elections for the lower house) to form the Reform Progressive Party, which was intended to be a moderate-conservative party.

Electoral history

Presidential elections

Notes 
Election was on electoral college not popular vote

Chamber of Deputies and Senate elections

Notorious members 
Former members

References 

Conservative parties in Brazil
Defunct political parties in Brazil
1979 establishments in Brazil
Political parties established in 1979
1993 disestablishments in Brazil
Political parties disestablished in 1993